Dream is American pop singer Yuna Ito's third Japanese studio album. The album was released on May 27, 2009, under her label Studioseven Recordings. The album was released in two formats: CD-only and a limited CD+DVD version that contains four music videos and the making of the video. The motto of the album is: "If you can dream it, you can do it".

Overview
The release of Dream comes just over one year after Ito's second studio album, Wish. Dream includes the three singles that were released in order to promote the album. Also included in the album is the answer song to "Ima Demo Zutto", featuring hip-hop duo Spontania which was also used to promote the album.

Promotion
The first single "Miss You" was used as the background song for Ito En's Vitamin Fruit commercial in which Ito appeared. "Koi wa Groovy x2" was used to promote the Gap's 2008 Holiday Collection "Winter Neutrals" campaign. "Trust You" was used as the ending theme song for the second season of anime series Mobile Suit Gundam 00. "Brand New World", the B-side for "Trust You" was used as the background music for Hawkins Sports. Unlike the other three songs, Love Machine Gun was not released as a single but was used as the insert song for the cell phone novel .

Track listing

Singles
Miss You: The first single released from Dream. "Miss You" debuted at #20 on the Oricon single chart.
Koi wa Groovy x2: The second single from the album. It debuted at #44 on the charts.
Trust You: The last single from the album was "Trust You". "Trust You" debuted at #5 on the charts.

Charts and certifications

References

External links
 Official website 

Yuna Ito albums
2009 albums